Koderma Junction railway station, station code KQR, is railway station of the Indian railway serving the city of Jhumri Telaiya, Koderma, the headquarters of Koderma district in the Indian state of Jharkhand.

Geography
Grand Chord rail-line that connects Howrah and New Delhi passes through Koderma Junction. Other 3 lines have been connected with Koderma making it a junction namely Koderma–Hazaribagh–Barkakana–Ranchi line, Koderma–Giridih–Madhupur line and Koderma–Tilaiya line. Koderma has a rail connectivity with the other major parts of the country such as Delhi, Mumbai, Kolkata, Ahmedabad, Indore, Bhopal, Gwalior,  Jabalpur, Jaipur, Nagpur, Pune, Guwahati etc.

History
The Grand Chord was opened in 1906.

Electrification
The Gomoh–Koderma sector was electrified in 1961–62.

Facilities 
The station houses all the major facilities like waiting rooms, computerized reservation facility, bookshop, etc.

Trains 
Koderma station's location on the Grand Chord, makes it served by numerous express and superfast trains from all over the country. Several electrified local passenger trains also run from Koderma to neighbouring destinations at regular intervals.

Nearest airports
The nearest airports to Koderma station are:
Birsa Munda Airport, Ranchi  
Netaji Subhash Chandra Bose International Airport, Kolkata
Gaya Airport 
Lok Nayak Jayaprakash Airport, Patna

See also 

 Koderma

References

External links 
 Koderma Railway Station Map
 Official website of the Koderma district

Kodarma
Railway stations in Koderma district
Dhanbad railway division